Mohammad Wasiullah Khan  is the founder and chancellor of East-West University, a private, non-profit, non-denominational college based in Chicago's South Loop neighbourhood. He is also a veteran of the Pakistani educational system, working in the mid-to-late 1950s in Government College, Sukkur, Pakistan.

Education and career
Wasiullah Khan, a Pakistani-American, got his MA and MEd Honors degrees from the University of the Punjab and PhD in Educational Administration from Indiana University. He had been a teacher and administrator in Pakistan before he came to Berkeley, California in the 1970s. He has been an educational researcher in Indiana and became an Academic Dean in a minority college in Chicago.

In November 1978, he held the convention of a planning group to establish a new, multi-cultural institution of higher learning in Chicago. In September 1980, after approvals from the state and federal agencies, East–West University started operations as a not-for-profit institution in Chicago.

In April 2000, East-West university acquired an 8-storey building as an extension of its campus. Fall 2003 student enrollment at the university was over 1000.

Wasiullah Khan was the President of Pakistani American Congress (2005-2007).

Books
Wasiullah Khan contributed to and edited a book, published by Hodder & Stoughton, Kent, UK. He wrote an extensive introduction in this book: Education and Society in the Muslim World. 5000

References

External links
East West University, Chicago, Illinois - official website

Year of birth missing (living people)
Living people
Pakistani educational theorists
American educational theorists
American academics of Pakistani descent
American writers of Pakistani descent
Indiana University alumni
University of the Punjab alumni
People from Chicago
People from Berkeley, California
Pakistani emigrants to the United States
Pakistani expatriates in the United States
University and college founders
Pakistani educators
Pakistani civil servants